Langford Reed (11 November 1878 – 8 March 1954) was a British author, writer and collector of limericks, scriptwriter, director and actor of the silent film era.

Biography
Reed was born in Clapham in London in 1878 as Herbert Langford Reed, the son of Emma Mary née Williams (1848–) and John Herbert Reed (1834-1919), a manufacturer of hosiery. 'Bertie' Reed was educated in Clapham and at Hove College. In 1911 aged 32 he was a journalist living with his parents with the family home now being a boarding house. He married the theatre and film costume designer Henrietta 'Hetty' Elizabeth Spiers (1881-1973) at Lambeth in London in 1912. Their daughter, the actress Joan Mary Langford Reed (1917-1997) made her screen début aged 2 years in The Heart of a Rose (1919), written by her father. She went on to appear in Testimony (1920), The Wonderful Wooing (1925) and The Luck of the Navy (1927). She was the first winner of the ‘Navana Juvenile Beauty Competition’ in 1922 and in 1923 featured in the Glaxo Baby Food advertising campaign.

During World War I Langford Reed served as a Private in the Middlesex Regiment with the British Army in France. He was a prolific scriptwriter for silent film and was the author of a number of books of 'clean' or 'laundered' limericks which he collected or wrote and various of which were illustrated by H. M. Bateman among others, including The Complete Limerick Book (1924); The Indiscreet Limerick Book (1925); Nonsense  Verses - An Anthology (editor, c1925);  Daphne Goes Down (1925), written with his wife; Further Nonsense: Verse and Prose by Lewis Carroll (editor, 1926); Nonsense Tales for the Young (1927); Who's Who in Filmland (1931) with Hetty Spiers; The Life of Lewis Carroll (1932); Limericks for the Beach, Bathroom and Boudoir (1933); Mr Punch's Limerick Book (editor, 1934); The Limerick Calendar (1935); Sausages & Sundials: A Book of Nonsense Ballads (c1935); The Complete Rhyming Dictionary (1936); My Limerick Book (1937); Another Limerick Calendar (c1939); with his wife Hetty Spiers he wrote The Mantle of Methuselah: A Farcical Novel (1939); and The Writer's Rhyming Dictionary (1961).

A prolific film writer and director, he was known for The Tempest (1908); wrote the intertitles for and edited Chase Me Charlie (1918), a seven-reel montage of Charlie Chaplin's Essanay films released in Great Britain; The Heart of a Rose (1919); A Lass o' the Looms (1919) and Potter's Clay (1922), the screenplay of which was adapted with his wife in to a novel in 1923. A Freemason, he joined the Authors' Lodge No. 3456 in 1921.

In his later years he lived at 59 Carlton Hill in St John's Wood with his wife Henrietta Elizabeth Reed.

He died in Hampstead in London in 1954 and was buried in the churchyard of St John-at-Hampstead. Fittingly, Reed has a limerick on his headstone:
There once was a fellow named Reed,
Who knew that the world had a need,
For limericks and fun,
And all hearts he won,
Since laughter and joy were his creed. 

The laughter and joy will not die,
As angels laugh with him on high,
While we here on Earth
Should cultivate mirth.
'Tis better to laugh than to cry.

In his will he left £110.

Filmography

Actor
1906: Saved by a Lie directed by Percy Stow
1907: A Knight Errant directed by J. H. Martin

Scriptwriter

1906: Saved by a Lie directed by Percy Stow
1907: Disturbing His Rest directed by Percy Stow
1907: A Knight Errant directed by J. H. Martin
1907: The Wreck of the Mary Jane directed by Percy Stow
1907: The Story of a Modern Mother directed by Percy Stow
1907: Adventures of a Bath Chair directed by Percy Stow
1907: An Awkward Situation directed by Percy Stow
1907: The Water Babies directed by Percy Stow
1907: The Pied Piper directed by Percy Stow
1907: That's Not Right: Watch Me! directed by Percy Stow
1907]: An Anxious Day for Mother directed by Percy Stow
1908: The Little Waif and the Captain's Daughter directed by Percy Stow
1908: The Captain's Wives directed by Percy Stow
1908: Three Maiden Ladies and a Bull directed by Percy Stow
1908: Three Suburban Sportsmen and a Hat directed by Percy Stow
1908: Mr. Jones Has a Tile Loose directed by Percy Stow
1908: If Women Were Policemen directed by Percy Stow
1908: The Old Composer and the Prima Donna directed by Percy Stow
1908: Follow Your Leader and the Master Follows Last directed by Percy Stow
1908: The Cavalier's Wife directed by Percy Stow
1908: Robin Hood and His Merry Men directed by Percy Stow
1908: Nancy directed by Percy Stow
1908: Algy's Yachting Party directed by Percy Stow

1908: The Tempest directed by Percy Stow
The Puritan Maid and the Royalist Refugee directed by Percy Stow
1908: A Modern Cinderella directed by Percy Stow
1908: When the Man in the Moon Seeks a Wife directed by Percy Stow
1908: The Old Favourite and the Ugly Golliwog directed by Percy Stow
1908: The Martyrdom of Thomas A Becket directed by Percy Stow
1908: Ib and Little Christina directed by Percy Stow
1909: The Love of a Nautch Girl directed by Percy Stow
1909: The Crafty Usurper and the Young King directed by Percy Stow
1909: His Work or His Wife directed by Percy Stow
1909: Hard Times directed by Percy Stow
1914: The Temptation of Joseph directed by Percy Stow
1914: The Rival Anarchists
1914: The Little God
1914: The Catch of the Season
1915: The Angel of the Ward directed by Tom Watts
1918: Chase Me Charlie
1919: The Heart of a Rose directed by Jack Denton
1919: A Lass o' the Looms directed by Jack Denton
1920: The Woman Hater directed by Sidney M. Goldin
1920: The Bird Fancier directed by Sidney M. Goldin
1922: Potter's Clay directed by H. Grenville-Taylor and Douglas Payne
1945 He Snoops to Conquer (contributor)

Director 
1914: The Temptation of Joseph
1914: The Rival Anarchists
1914: The Little God
1914: The Catch of the Season
1914: The Cleansing of a Dirty Dog
1918: Chase Me Charlie

References

External links
 
 

1878 births
1954 deaths
People from Clapham
British Army personnel of World War I
Freemasons of the United Grand Lodge of England
English male film actors
English male silent film actors
20th-century English male actors
Silent film screenwriters
Silent film directors
Comedy fiction writers
20th-century English novelists
20th-century screenwriters
Anthologists